
Merula may refer to:

People
Lucius Cornelius Merula (consul 193 BC), Roman politician and general of the 2nd century BC
Gnaeus Cornelius Merula, envoy to Cyprus, Crete and Asia Minor in the 2nd century BC
Lucius Cornelius Merula (consul 87 BC), Roman senator and priest of Jupiter
Georgius Merula, 15th-century Italian classical scholar
Paulus Merula, 16th-century Dutch librarian and scholar
Tarquinio Merula, Italian Baroque composer of the 17th century
, a coastal tanker in service with Ape Azionaria Petroliere from 1949 to 1951

Zoology
Turdus merula, the common blackbird
Percnodaimon merula, a butterfly from New Zealand
Dendrocincla merula, the white-chinned woodcreeper

Geography 
 Merula (creek), a tributary of the Ligurian Sea

See also